John Cole "Jack" Reedman (9 October 1865 – 29 March 1924) was a leading Australian sportsman of the late nineteenth and early twentieth century.

Australian football career
Reedman began to make his mark as an Australian rules footballer in 1884, whilst playing parklands football for Medindie. He went on to join Hotham who were in the Adelaide Suburban Association (ASA) competition, and was a key member of the club's 1885 premiership side. He captained Hotham when they again won the ASA premiership in 1886.

Hotham joined the South Australian Football Association (SAFA) in 1887, with Reedman as captain. Just prior to the 1888 football season, Hotham changed their name to North Adelaide (no connection to the current club) and again Reedman was captain.

When Hotham/North Adelaide amalgamated with the Adelaide club in 1889, Reedman moved to South Adelaide, where he was appointed captain, a position he held until 1898, playing 172 consecutive matches (bringing his total to 200) and leading South to five premierships in seven years before the introduction of electorate football (whereby footballers had to play for their local team) forced his move to North Adelaide in 1899. Reedman led North Adelaide from 1901 to 1905, and in that time the club won premierships in 1902 and 1905, with Reedman also being part of the 1900 premiership team. He also captained South Australia in 1903.

Following his retirement from playing, Reedman was appointed coach of the lowly West Adelaide Football Club in 1908. To the end of 1907, West Adelaide had won only 23 and drawn 1 of the 145 SAFA matches they had played, and had been perennially close to or on the bottom of the ladder. Reedman coached West Adelaide to its first ever premiership in 1908, and then defeated Victorian Football League (VFL) premiers Carlton Football Club to become Champions of Australia. Reedman promptly left West Adelaide to return to North Adelaide for one last season as a player, but it was an inauspicious finale, as the red and whites finished second last.

Reedman played 115 matches for North Adelaide, bringing his career total to 319 matches at his retirement at the age of 43, with his 319 career matches remaining a record in South Australian elite football until it was broken by Lindsay Head in 1970, while his 200 consecutive matches was a record in elite football until it was broken by Jack Titus in 1943.

His brother Sid also captained South Adelaide.

Cricket career
Reedman made his first-class cricket debut for South Australia on 17 February 1888 against Victoria at the Adelaide Oval. An all-rounder, Reedman made a duck in his only innings of the match and did not bowl as South Australia won by an innings and 113 runs. Despite this inauspicious start, Reedman went on to captain South Australia and represent Australia in one Test match against England, at the Sydney Cricket Ground (SCG) during the 1894/95 Ashes series. Reedman made 17 and four and produced bowling figures of 1/12 and 0/12.

In addition to his football and cricket exploits, Reedman was also a leading long-distance swimmer of the period.

Honours
Reedman has been selected as a back pocket and change ruckman in South Adelaide's official "Greatest Team". In 1996, he was inducted into the Australian Football Hall of Fame and in 2002, he was inducted into the South Australian Football Hall of Fame.

Personal life
Reedman worked as a letter sorter in Adelaide. He also coached the cricket and football teams at Prince Alfred College for many years. He died in March 1924 aged 58, after several years of ill-health, leaving a widow, three sons and a daughter.

See also
List of Australian rules football and cricket players

References

Sources

External links
 
 Australian Football Hall of Fame

1865 births
1924 deaths
Australian cricketers
Australia Test cricketers
South Australia cricketers
South Adelaide Football Club players
North Adelaide Football Club players
West Adelaide Football Club coaches
South Adelaide Football Club coaches
Australian Football Hall of Fame inductees
South Australian Football Hall of Fame inductees
Australian rules footballers from Adelaide
Cricketers from Adelaide
West Torrens Football Club coaches